At least two naval vessels of Japan have borne the name Haruna:

 , a battleship of the Imperial Japanese Navy

Japanese Navy ship names